Savo Mitrovic (born February 4, 1969) is a Serbian-Canadian former professional ice hockey player.

Savo Mitrovic contributed greatly to University of New Hampshire men's hockey from 1988 through 1992. He was awarded the 1992 Charles E. Holt Coaches Award. 

Mitrovic played for the Greensboro Monarchs and Huntsville Blast in the ECHL, the Phoenix Mustangs of the West Coast Hockey League, the Detroit Falcons and Port Huron Border Cats of the Colonial Hockey League, and the Odessa Jackalopes of the Western Professional Hockey League during his career. He never played in Serbia.

References

External links

1969 births
Anaheim Bullfrogs players
Canadian ice hockey centres
Detroit Falcons (CoHL) players
Greensboro Monarchs players
Huntsville Blast players
Living people
National Hockey League supplemental draft picks
Phoenix Mustangs players
Pittsburgh Penguins draft picks
Port Huron Border Cats players
New Hampshire Wildcats men's ice hockey players
Odessa Jackalopes players
Serbian emigrants to Canada
Yugoslav emigrants to Canada
Sportspeople from Belgrade